The 1953–54 Duke Blue Devils men's basketball team represented Duke University in the 1953–54 NCAA men's basketball season. The team's head coach was Harold Bradley and the team finished the season with an overall record of 21–6.

References

Duke
Duke Blue Devils men's basketball seasons
1953 in sports in North Carolina
1954 in sports in North Carolina